Ballylickey or Ballylicky is a village on the N71 national secondary road and Bantry Bay near Bantry, County Cork, Ireland. The Ouvane River flows into Bantry Bay at Ballylickey.

Tourism
There is a caravan park at Eagle Point. The Seaview Hotel is also located in the area.

The area's most prominent building is Ballylickey House, owned by the Graves family for generations and in modern times a hotel and Michelin-starred restaurant.

People
 Philip Graves, journalist and exposer of The Protocols of the Elders of Zion as a hoax 
 Ellen Hutchins, botanist
 Jeanne Rynhart, sculptor of the Molly Malone statue

See also
 List of Cork archaeological sites
 List of towns and villages in Ireland

References

Towns and villages in County Cork